3D Vision may refer to:

 3D Vision Records, a Spanish record label
 Nvidia 3D Vision, a LC shutter glasses kit for Windows platform

See also

 Depth perception, the visual ability to perceive the world in three dimensions